Marquess of Aberdeen and Temair, in the County of Aberdeen, in the County of Meath and in the County of Argyll, is a title in the Peerage of the United Kingdom. It was created on 4 January 1916 for John Hamilton-Gordon, 7th Earl of Aberdeen.

Family history

Baronetcy of Haddo
The Gordon family descends from John Gordon, who fought as a Royalist against the Covenanters in the Civil War. In 1642 he was created a baronet, of Haddo in the County of Aberdeen, in the Baronetage of Nova Scotia. In 1644 he was found guilty of treason and beheaded, with the baronetcy forfeited. The title was restored after the Restoration for his son John, the second Baronet.

Earldom of Aberdeen
The second Baronet died without male issue and was succeeded by his younger brother, the third Baronet. He was a noted advocate and served as Lord President of the Court of Session and as Lord Chancellor of Scotland. On 30 November 1682 he was raised to the Peerage of Scotland as Lord Haddo, Methlick, Tarves and Kellie, Viscount of Formartine and Earl of Aberdeen. He was succeeded by his only surviving son, the second Earl. He sat in the House of Lords as a Scottish Representative Peer from 1721 to 1727. On his death the titles passed to his eldest son from his second marriage, the third Earl. He was a Scottish Representative Peer from 1747 to 1761 and from 1774 to 1790.

Lord Aberdeen, Prime Minister
The third earl was succeeded by his grandson, the fourth Earl, who was the eldest son of George Gordon, Lord Haddo. On 1 June 1814 he was created Viscount Gordon, of Aberdeen in the County of Aberdeen, in the Peerage of the United Kingdom, which entitled him to an automatic seat in the House of Lords. Lord Aberdeen was a distinguished diplomat and statesman and served as Foreign Secretary from 1828 to 1830 and from 1841 to 1846 and as Prime Minister of the United Kingdom from 1852 to 1855. Aberdeen married firstly Lady Catherine Elizabeth (1784–1812), daughter of John Hamilton, 1st Marquess of Abercorn, and assumed by Royal licence the additional surname of Hamilton in 1818. 

When Lord Aberdeen died, the titles passed to his eldest son from his second marriage to Harriet Douglas, the fifth Earl. He sat as Liberal Member of Parliament (MP)] for Aberdeenshire. His eldest son, the sixth Earl, was a sailor and adventurer. He was accidentally drowned off the coast of America in 1870, without marrying or having children.

Marquess of Aberdeen and Temair

The sixth earl of Aberdeen was succeeded by his younger brother, the seventh Earl. John Hamilton-Gordon, was a Liberal politician and served as Lord-Lieutenant of Ireland in 1886 and from 1905 to 1915 and as Governor General of Canada from 1893 to 1898. On 4 January 1916 he was created Earl of Haddo, in the County of Aberdeen, and Marquess of Aberdeen and Temair, in the County of Aberdeen, in the County of Meath and in the County of Argyll. Both titles are in the Peerage of the United Kingdom.

He was succeeded by his eldest son, the second Marquess, who was a member of the London County Council and served as Lord-Lieutenant of Aberdeenshire. He was childless and was succeeded by his younger brother, the third Marquess. He was notably President of the Federation of British Industries. When he died the titles passed to his eldest son, the fourth Marquess. He was a member of the Aberdeenshire County Council and Lord-Lieutenant of Aberdeenshire. He had four adopted children but no biological issue and was succeeded by his younger brother, the fifth Marquess. He was a broadcaster working for the BBC. He never married and on his death in 1984 the titles passed to his fourth and youngest brother, the sixth Marquess. He was Chairman of The Arts Club.  the titles are held by his grandson, the eighth Marquess, who succeeded in that year.

Other family members
Numerous other members of the Gordon family have also gained distinction. The Hon. William Gordon (died 1816), eldest son from the third marriage of the second Earl, was a general in the Army. The Hon. Cosmo Gordon, second son from the third marriage of the second Earl, was a colonel in the Army. The Hon. Alexander Gordon (1739–1792), third son from the third marriage of the second Earl, was a Lord of Session from 1788 to 1792 under the judicial title of Lord Rockville. His son William Duff-Gordon was Member of Parliament for Worcester. In 1815 he succeeded his uncle as second Baron of Halkin according to a special remainder and assumed the additional surname of Duff (see Duff-Gordon baronets for further history of this branch of the family). The Hon. William Gordon, younger brother of the fourth Earl, was a vice-admiral in the Royal Navy and sat as Member of Parliament for Aberdeenshire. The Hon. Alexander Gordon (1786–1815), younger brother of the fourth Earl, was a soldier and was killed at the Battle of Waterloo.

The Hon. Sir Robert Gordon, younger brother of the fourth Earl, was a diplomat and served as British Ambassador to Austria. The Hon. John Gordon (1792–1869), younger brother of the fourth Earl, was an admiral in the Royal Navy. The Hon. Sir Alexander Hamilton-Gordon (1817–1890), eldest son of the second marriage of the fourth Earl, was a general in the Army and sat as Member of Parliament for Aberdeenshire East. His eldest son, Sir Alexander Hamilton-Gordon was also a general in the Army. Reverend the Hon. Douglas Hamilton-Gordon (1824–1901), third son of the second marriage of the fourth Earl, was Chaplain-in-Ordinary to Queen Victoria and Canon of Salisbury. The Hon. Arthur Hamilton-Gordon, fourth son of the second marriage of the fourth Earl, was a Liberal politician and was created Baron Stanmore in 1893 (see this title for more information on him and this branch of the family). Ishbel Hamilton-Gordon, Marchioness of Aberdeen and Temair, daughter of Dudley Marjoribanks, 1st Baron Tweedmouth, and wife of the first Marquess of Aberdeen and Temair, was an author, philanthropist and an advocate of woman's interests.

The family seat is Haddo House, Aberdeenshire. The title Earl of Haddo is the courtesy title for the Marquess's eldest son and heir, the eldest son of whom uses the courtesy title Viscount of Formartine. The Marquesses of Aberdeen and Temair are related to the Marquesses of Huntly. Sir John Gordon (died c. 1395) of Strathbogie, ancestor of Sir John Gordon, 1st Baronet, was the brother of Elizabeth Gordon. She married Sir Alexander Seton (died 1438) and was the mother of Alexander Gordon, 1st Earl of Huntly (ancestor of the Marquesses of Huntly).

Gordon baronets, of Haddo (1642)

Sir John Gordon, 1st Baronet (1610–1644)
Sir John Gordon, 2nd Baronet (c. 1632–1665)
Sir George Gordon, 3rd Baronet (1637–1720) (created Earl of Aberdeen in 1682)

Earls of Aberdeen (1682)
Other titles (1st Earl onwards): Viscount of Formartine (Sc 1682), Lord Haddo, Methlick, Tarves and Kellie (Sc 1682)
Other titles (4th Earl onwards): Viscount Gordon (UK 1814)
 George Gordon, 1st Earl of Aberdeen (1637–1720)
George Gordon, Lord Haddo (1674-d. between 1694–1708)
 William Gordon, 2nd Earl of Aberdeen (1679–1745)
 George Gordon, 3rd Earl of Aberdeen, (1722–1801)
George Gordon, Lord Haddo (1764–1791)
 George Hamilton-Gordon, 4th Earl of Aberdeen (1784–1860) (created Viscount Gordon in 1814)
 George John James Hamilton-Gordon, 5th Earl of Aberdeen (1816–1864)
 George Hamilton-Gordon, 6th Earl of Aberdeen (1841–1870)
 John Campbell Hamilton-Gordon, 7th Earl of Aberdeen (1847–1934) (created Marquess of Aberdeen and Temair in 1916)

Marquesses of Aberdeen and Temair (1916)
Other titles (1st Marquess onwards): Earl of Haddo (UK 1916), Viscount Gordon (UK 1814), Viscount of Formartine (Sc 1682), Lord Haddo, Methlick, Tarves and Kellie (Sc 1682)
 John Campbell Gordon, 1st Marquess of Aberdeen and Temair, (1847–1934)
 George Gordon, 2nd Marquess of Aberdeen and Temair (1879–1965)
 Dudley Gladstone Gordon, 3rd Marquess of Aberdeen and Temair (1883–1972)
 David George Ian Alexander Gordon, 4th Marquess of Aberdeen and Temair (1908–1974)
 Archibald Victor Dudley Gordon, 5th Marquess of Aberdeen and Temair (1913–1984)
 Alastair Ninian John Gordon, 6th Marquess of Aberdeen and Temair (1920–2002)
 Alexander George Gordon, 7th Marquess of Aberdeen and Temair (1955–2020)
 George Ian Alastair Gordon, 8th Marquess of Aberdeen and Temair (b. 1983)

Present peer
George Ian Alastair Gordon, 8th Marquess of Aberdeen and Temair (born 4 May 1983) is the son of the 7th Marquess and his wife Joanna Clodagh Houldsworth. Styled formally as Viscount Formartine from 1984, he was educated at Harrow School. 

He was styled as Earl of Haddo between 2002 and 12 March 2020, when he succeeded his father as Marquess of Aberdeen and Temair, Earl of Haddo, Earl of Aberdeen, Viscount of Formartine, Viscount Gordon of Aberdeen, Lord Haddo, Methlick, Tarves and Kellie, and also as a baronet (Gordon, of Haddo, Aberdeenshire, 1642).

As Lord Haddo he married Isabelle Coaten, daughter of David Coaten, and they have four children 
Ivo Alexander Ninian Gordon, Earl of Haddo (born 2012), heir apparent
Lord Johnny David Nehemiah Gordon (born 2014)
Lady Christabel Alexandra Lully Gordon (born 2016)
Lord Louis George Solomon Gordon (born 2018)

Line of succession

  John Campbell Gordon, 1st Marquess of Aberdeen and Temair (1847–1934)
  Dudley Gladstone Gordon, 3rd Marquess of Aberdeen and Temair (1883–1972)
  Alastair Ninian John Gordon, 6th Marquess of Aberdeen and Temair (1920–2002)
  Alexander George Gordon, 7th Marquess of Aberdeen and Temair (1955–2020)
  George Ian Alastair Gordon, 8th Marquess of Aberdeen and Temair (born 1983)
 (1) Ivo Alexander Ninian Gordon, Earl of Haddo (born 2012)
(2) Lord Johnny David Nehemiah Gordon (born 2014)
(3) Lord Louis George Solomon Gordon (born 2018)
 (4) Lord Sam Dudley Gordon (born 1985)
 (5) Bertie Raiph Dudley Gordon (born 2016)
 (6) Lord Charles David Gordon (born 1990)

There are further heirs to the subsidiary Earldom of Aberdeen, including the Duff-Gordon baronets, who are descended from Lord Rockville, a younger son of the second earl.

See also
Baron Stanmore
Duff-Gordon baronets

References

Bibliography

Marquessates in the Peerage of the United Kingdom
Marquess
1916 establishments in the United Kingdom
Noble titles created in 1916